Tacoma was a steamship that served from 1913 to 1938 on Puget Sound.  Built of steel, Tacoma was known for being one of the fastest and best-designed vessels to operate on Puget Sound.  Tacoma was particularly noted for high-speed service from 1913 to 1930 on the route between Tacoma and Seattle.

Design and construction
On 12 August 1912, the Puget Sound Navigation Company ("PSN'") contracted with the Seattle Construction and Drydock Company to build for them a passenger vessel which would run at a regular speed of 19 knots and which would be ready for service by 1 March 1913.  PSN had decided to replace its fleet of wooden steamers with steel-built replacements, and Tacoma was intended to be the first of a new series of high-speed vessels.  Tacoma was designed by James V. Paterson, the president of Seattle Construction and Drydock.

Tacoma was launched on 3 May 1913.  The vessel was christened by Florence Lister, daughter of the governor of Oregon.  Various dignitaries were brought to the launching in another PSN vessel, the steel steamship Indianapolis, with PSN President Joshua Green on board.  Acceptance trials were conducted on 16 June 1913, and the vessel was found capable of 20.78 knots.  Later the vessel was found to be capable of running even faster, at 21.5 knots.

Propulsion
Tacoma was driven by a single propeller, driven by a steam engine about 35 feet long.  The engine was a four-cylinder, triple-expansion type, which was designed to extract the maximum energy possible from the steam.  Twin oil-fired Ballin water-tube boilers supplied steam at 250 pounds pressure.

Operations on Puget Sound
On 24 June 1913 Tacoma made its first regular run from Seattle to Tacoma in 77 minutes.  This was a new speed record for the route.  With the aid of a tug, Tacoma could be turned at the Tacoma municipal dock in 2.5 minutes, half the time it took to turn Indianapolis, then the other major vessel on the route.  About six months after Tacoma began on the route, command of the vessel was taken over by Capt. Everett B. Coffin, one of the most experienced steamboat captains of Puget Sound.  He had commanded the famous Flyer for much of the time from 1890 to 1911 when Flyer had dominated the Seattle-Tacoma route in competition with the Puget Sound Navigation Company.

Tacoma was a well-designed vessel which handled extremely well.  Captain Coffin, in later years after Tacoma had been taken out of service, described the vessel in comparison to Flyer.

End of regular service 
Tacoma continued in service until better roads and increased automobile and bus traffic between Seattle and Tacoma forced the termination of regular marine passenger between the two cities.  Tacomas last run on December 15, 1930 marked the real end of commercial passenger activity for steamboats on Puget Sound.  Marine historians Newell and Williamson documented the occasion:

When Tacoma arrived at the dock in Tacoma harbor that last night, every ship in the port blew three blasts on their whistles as a salute.  Andrew Foss, owner of the great Foss tug concern, sent Foss No. 17 to help Tacoma make the landing, even though it had been two years since Tacoma could afford a tug.  Departing that last time on her return to Seattle, Tacoma passed the hull of the Greyhound, once the fastest boat on the Sound and now, minus her upper works, engines and sternwheel, in service as a mudscow.

Last years 
Tacoma was still a sound vessel, and from time to time was placed on excursion runs or on the Seattle to Victoria.  When the Puget Sound Navigation Company brought the streamlined ferry Kalakala on to the Seattle-Bremerton route, the mechanical problems of Kalakala required that Tacoma escort the ferry on the first run west across the Sound to Bremerton.  During the westbound trip, to avoid embarrassing the owners, who had billed Kalakala as the fast ferry on the sound, Tacoma was restricted to running at Kalakalas maximum speed, about 17 knots.  On the return, however, made by Tacoma alone without Kalakala, Captain Coffin ran Tacoma at top speed, which set a speed record for the trip.  Captain Coffin recalled the Tacoma's later years:

Sold for scrap 
In October 1938, Puget Sound Navigation company sold Tacoma, and a number of other vessels, to Seattle Iron and Metals Corporation, for scrapping.

Notes

References 
 Kline, Mary S., and Bayless, George A., Ferryboats - A Legend on Puget Sound, Bayless Books, Seattle, WA 1983 
 Newell, Gordon R., H.W. McCurdy Marine History of the Pacific Northwest, Superior Publishing, Seattle WA 1966 
 Newell, Gordon R., Ships of the Inland Sea, Binford and Mort, Portland, OR (2d Ed. 1960)

Further reading
 Carey, Roland, The Sound of Steamers, Alderbrook Publishing, Seattle, WA 1965
 Carey, Roland, The Steamboat Landing on Elliott Bay, Alderbrook Publishing Co., Seattle, WA 1962
 Gibbs, Jim, and Williamson, Joe, Maritime Memories of Puget Sound, Schiffer Publishing, West Chester PA 1987

External links 

 Tacoma, at EvergreenFleet.com

Steamboats of Washington (state)
Propeller-driven steamboats of Washington (state)
Passenger ships of the United States